Ārijs Geikins (14 February 1936 – 10 February 2008) was a Latvian playwright, writer, director, actor and drama teacher. He was best known for his 1982 play, Leģenda par Kaupo.

References

External links 
 

1936 births
2008 deaths
Latvian dramatists and playwrights
Latvian novelists
Latvian male stage actors
Latvian male film actors
Latvian male television actors
Writers from Riga
20th-century dramatists and playwrights
20th-century Latvian male actors
Russian Academy of Theatre Arts alumni
Burials at Forest Cemetery, Riga